Ragamuffin is the second novel by Caribbean science fiction writer Tobias S. Buckell. It is the sequel to his first novel, Crystal Rain.

Buckell labeled Ragamuffin a "Caribbean space opera", with his previous novel being called "Caribbean steampunk".  It is followed by his third novel, Sly Mongoose.

Ragamuffin was nominated for the 2007 Nebula Award for Best Novel and was a finalist for the 2008 Prometheus Award.

References

External links
Macmillan.com

2007 American novels
American science fiction novels
Novels by Tobias S. Buckell
Caribbean in fiction
Tor Books books